List of compositions by Arlene Sierra.

Works for orchestra 

 Bird Symphony for Orchestra (2021)
 Nature Symphony for Orchestra (2017)
 Moler for Orchestra (2012)
 Game of Attrition for Chamber Orchestra (2009)
 Aquilo for Orchestra (2001)
 Aquae for Orchestra (2000)
 Ballistae for Orchestra (2000)
 Mantegna Diptych for Orchestra (2000)

Soloist and orchestra 

Art of War Concerto for Piano and Orchestra (2010)
 Dedication and Dance Trombone Concerto for Orchestra or Symphonic Winds (1994, revised 2003)

Wind ensemble 

 Dedication and Dance Trombone Concerto for Orchestra or Symphonic Winds (1994, revised 2003)

Large ensemble (7 or more players) 

 Colmena for 14 Players (2008)
 Cicada Shell for Septet (2006)
 Tiffany Windows for 12 players (2002)
 Four Choreographic Studies for 10 Players (2001)
 Ballistae for 13 Players (2000)

Soloist and large ensemble (7 or more players) 

 Neruda Settings for Soprano and Chamber Ensemble (2002–5)

Works for 2 to 6 players 

 Butterflies Remember a Mountain for Piano Trio (2013)
 Avian Mirrors for Violin and Cello (2013)
 Insects in Amber String Quartet (2010)
 Surrounded Ground for Sextet (2008)
 A Conflict of Opposites for Violin or Clarinet and Piano (2005)
 Truel for Piano Trio or Clarinet Trio (2004–7)
 Truel 1 for Piano Trio or Clarinet Trio (2002–3)
 Counting-Out Rhyme for Cello and Piano (2002)
 Zwei Huhner for Oboe and Trombone (200o)
 Harrow-Lines for Quintet (1999)
 of Risk and Memory for Two Pianos (1997)
 Four Love Songs for Viola and Piano (1993)
 Duo for Violoncelli (1993)

Solo works 

 Birds and Insects, Book 2 for Solo Piano and recorded birdsong (2015–18)
 Cricket-Viol for Solo Viola/Voice (2010)
 Birds and Insects, Book 1 Piano Solo (2007)
 The Art of Lightness Flute Solo (2006)
 Two Etudes After Mantegna Cello Solo (1998)

Solo voice and up to 6 players 

 Hearing Things for Soprano and Piano (2008)
 Streets and Rivers for Baritone and Piano (2007)
 Two Neruda Odes for Soprano, Cello and Piano (2004)
 Hand Mit Ringen for Soprano and Trio (2002)
 Three Descriptions for Soprano and Piano (1997)

Electroacoustic works 

 Urban Birds for 3 Pianos with Percussion and Recorded Birdsong (2014)
 Birds and Insects, Book 2 for Solo Piano and recorded birdsong (2015–18)

Works with film 

 Studies in Choreography chamber ensemble score to two Maya Deren films (2019)
 Ritual in Transfigured Time chamber ensemble score to the Maya Deren film (2016)
 Meditation on Violence chamber ensemble score to the Maya Deren film (2012)

Opera and music theatre 

 Cuatro Corridos – Dalia Opera Scena for Soprano and Ensemble (2013)
 Faustine Opera in one act for 5 Singers and Orchestra (2011–)

Dance 

 Four Choreographic Studies for 10 Players (2001)

Chorus 

 Alike Dissolving for SATB, Children's Choir and String Orchestra (2001)
 Alike Dissolving for Unaccompanied SATB (2001)
 Alleluya (Bitter-Sweet) for four men's voices or SATB Chorus (2000)

References 

 Arlene Sierra's Website
 Cecilian Music Publishing Website

Sierra, Arlene